Orocrambus dicrenellus is a moth in the family Crambidae. This species was first described by Edward Meyrick in 1882 under the name Crambus dicrenellus. It is endemic to New Zealand. It has been recorded from the central part of the South Island.

The wingspan is 29–33 mm. Adults have been recorded on wing from November to February.

References

Crambinae
Moths described in 1882
Moths of New Zealand
Endemic fauna of New Zealand
Taxa named by Edward Meyrick
Endemic moths of New Zealand